Rootsiküla may refer to several places in Estonia:

Rootsiküla, Pärnu County, village in Kihnu Parish, Pärnu County
Rootsiküla, Saare County, village in Kihelkonna Parish, Saare County
Rootsiküla, Tartu County, village in Alatskivi Parish, Tartu County